The 1988 United States Senate election in Mississippi was held on November 8, 1988. Incumbent Democratic U.S. Senator John C. Stennis decided to retire instead of seeking a seventh full term. Republican Trent Lott won the open seat, becoming the first of his party to hold this seat in more than 100 years.

Democratic primary

Candidates 
 Wayne Dowdy, U.S. Congressman from the 4th district since 1981
 Dick Molpus, Secretary of State of Mississippi
 Gilbert Fountain, Pipefitter from  Biloxi

Results

Republican primary

Candidates 
 Trent Lott, U.S. Congressman from the 5th district since 1973, House Minority Whip since 1981

Results

See also 
 1988 United States Senate elections

References 

1988
Mississippi
1988 Mississippi elections